Fairchild TV 2 or FTV2 (Traditional Chinese: 新時代電視2台, Simplified Chinese: 新时代电视2台, Pinyin: xinshídàidiànshì èr tái), is a Canadian Cantonese language exempt Category B specialty channel. It is co-owned by majority owner Fairchild Media Group (a subsidiary of the Fairchild Group) and Television Broadcasts Limited which owns 20% of the business. Fairchild TV 2 HD has studios in Metro Vancouver Regional District (inside Aberdeen Centre in Richmond, British Columbia) and the Greater Toronto Area (Richmond Hill, Ontario). The station broadcasts in high definition.

History
In February 2013, Fairchild Media Group received permission from the Canadian Radio-television and Telecommunications Commission (CRTC) to launch Fairchild TV 2 HD.

On January 30, 2019, the CRTC approved Fairchild TV Ltd's request to convert Fairchild TV 2 from a licensed Category B specialty service to an exempted Cat. B third language service.

On September 1, 2020, the channel was renamed to Fairchild TV 2 with Fairchild TV 1 and Talentvision being upgraded to HD

Programs
Fairchild TV 2 broadcasts local Canadian and overseas programming in the Cantonese language.  It also serves as an overseas station of Hong Kong television station TVB. Unlike its sister station Fairchild TV 1, TVB programmes on Fairchild TV 2 are not delayed by up to a year and are broadcast a few days after it airs in Hong Kong.

See also
 Fairchild TV News
 Fairchild TV 1
 Talentvision

References

External links
  

Chinese-language television
Chinese-language mass media in Canada
Multicultural and ethnic television in Canada
Companies based in Richmond, British Columbia
Companies based in Richmond Hill, Ontario
Television channels and stations established in 2013
Mass media in the Regional Municipality of York
2013 establishments in Canada